Club Brugge KV is a football club based in Bruges in Belgium. It was founded in 1891 and is one of the top clubs in Belgium.

List of club captains
Below is a list of former club captains in the history of Club Brugge KV
  Jan Ceulemans (1986–91)
  Franky Van der Elst (1991–99)
  Vital Borkelmans (1999-00)
  Gert Verheyen (2000–02)
  Dany Verlinden (2002–04)
  Timmy Simons (2004–05)
  Gert Verheyen (2005–06)
  Sven Vermant (2006–08)
  Philippe Clement (2008–09)
  Stijn Stijnen (2009–10)
  Carl Hoefkens (2010–12)
  Ryan Donk (2012–13)
  Timmy Simons (2013–17)
  Ruud Vormer (2017–22)
  Hans Vanaken (2022–)

References

External links
 

Club Brugge KV
Club Brugge
1891 establishments